The pale-billed antpitta (Grallaria carrikeri) is a species of bird in the family Grallariidae. It is endemic to highland forest in the Andes of northern Peru.

References 

pale-billed antpitta
Birds of the Peruvian Andes
Endemic birds of Peru
pale-billed antpitta
Taxonomy articles created by Polbot